Line 4 of the Wuxi Metro is a rapid transit line in Wuxi, China.

Construction on the first phase of the line began on 28 March 2017. It opened on 17 December 2021.

Opening timeline

Stations (north to south)

References

4
Railway lines opened in 2021